Lawrence is the name of some places in the U.S. state of Wisconsin:
 Lawrence, Brown County, Wisconsin, a town
 Lawrence, Marquette County, Wisconsin, an unincorporated community
 Lawrence, Rusk County, Wisconsin, a town

Other
 St. Lawrence, Wisconsin, a town
 Saint Lawrence (community), Wisconsin, an unincorporated community